The emblem of Kuwait was created in 1962 and it consists of the shield of the flag design in color superimposed on a golden falcon (Hawk of Quraish) with wings displayed. The falcon supports a disk containing a boom sailing ship, a type of dhow, with the full name of the state written (in Arabic) at the top of the disk.

The dhow is a symbol of the maritime tradition of the country and is also found in the national coat of arms of Qatar (until 2008, also in the UAE coat of arms). The falcon is a symbol of the Banu Quraish line, to which the Islamic prophet Muhammad belonged and is likewise found in many coats of arms of the Arabian Peninsula.

The coat of arms replaced an older emblem with a falcon and two crossed flags.

See also
Flag of Kuwait

National symbols of Kuwait
Kuwait
Kuwait
Kuwait
Kuwait
Kuwait